The coat of arms of Saskatchewan is the heraldic symbol representing the Canadian province of Saskatchewan.

The arms, consisting of only the shield, was assigned by royal warrant of King Edward VII on 25 August 1906. It uses the provincial colours, green and gold. The remainder of the coat of arms was requested by the province in 1985, Saskatchewan Heritage Year, and was granted by royal proclamation of Queen Elizabeth II on 16 September 1986.

Symbolism
On the gold chief is a lion passant or leopard, a royal symbol of England. (English lions are usually gold with blue tongues and claws; however, the default colours for a heraldic lion on a gold field are red with blue tongue and claws.) The three gold sheaves of wheat, or garbs, represent the province's agriculture; the heraldic sheaf of wheat has become a generalized symbol of the province.

The helmet above the shield is gold and faces left, a symbol of Saskatchewan's co-sovereign status in Confederation. The mantling is in the national colours of Canada. The crest is a beaver, Canada's national animal, holding a western red lily, Saskatchewan's provincial flower. The crest is surmounted by a crown, representing royal sovereignty.

Both supporters – a royal lion to the left, and an indigenous white-tailed deer to the right – are wearing collars of First Nations beadwork, from which are suspended badges in the same six-pointed shape as the insignia of the Saskatchewan Order of Merit. The lion's badge is emblazoned with a maple leaf and the deer's, with a red lily. The supporters stand on a compartment of red lilies.

The motto is : from many peoples, strength.

Blazon 
The original royal warrant of 1906 blazoned the shield as follows:

The royal proclamation of 1986 blazoned the augmentations as follows:

Gallery

See also 
Flag of Saskatchewan
Symbols of Saskatchewan
Monarchy in Saskatchewan
List of Canadian provincial and territorial symbols
Heraldry

References

External links 

Saskatchewan Coat of Arms (Government of Saskatchewan)
Arms of Saskatchewan in the online Public Register of Arms, Flags and Badges

Provincial symbols of Saskatchewan
Saskatchewan
Saskatchewan
Saskatchewan
Saskatchewan
Saskatchewan
Saskatchewan
Saskatchewan
Saskatchewan